New Jersey's 11th congressional district is a suburban district in northern New Jersey. The district includes portions of Essex, Morris, and Passaic Counties; it is centered in Morris County. 

The 11th congressional district, along with the 12th, was created in 1913 based on the results of the 1910 census, and was centered in Essex County. The congressional seat was held by Democrats for almost 36 years under Hugh Joseph Addonizio and Joseph Minish. The 1980 redistricting shifted the focus of the district to the Republican-dominated Morris County.  Republican Dean Gallo defeated 22-year incumbent Democrat Joseph Minish in 1984. The district became one of the most reliably Republican districts in the Northeast. It has traditionally leaned Republican but has shifted slightly more Democratic in recent years, and has been represented by Democrat Mikie Sherrill since 2019.

Since 2023, the 11th district lost all of its towns in Sussex County, and gained several new towns in Essex County, such as Millburn and Belleville, but otherwise still contains most of Morris County. The current version of the district is not nearly as competitive, and is significantly more Democratic.

Counties and municipalities in the district
For the 118th and successive Congresses (based on redistricting following the 2020 Census), the district contains all or portions of three counties and 46 municipalities.

Essex County: (15)
Belleville, Bloomfield, Cedar Grove, Fairfield, Glen Ridge, Livingston, Maplewood, Millburn, Montclair (part; also 10th), North Caldwell, Nutley, Roseland, South Orange, West Caldwell.

Morris County: (27)
Boonton Town, Boonton Township, Butler, Chatham Borough, Chatham Township, Denville, Dover, East Hanover, Florham Park, Hanover, Harding, Jefferson Township, Kinnelon, Lincoln Park, Madison, Mendham Township (part; also 7th), Montville, Morris Plains, Morris Township, Morristown Town, Mountain Lakes, Parsippany-Troy Hills, Pequannock, Randolph Township, Riverdale, Rockaway Borough, Rockaway Township and Victory Gardens.

Passaic County: (4)
Little Falls, Totowa, Wayne (part; also 9th) and Woodland Park.

Recent statewide election results 
Results Under Current Lines (Since 2023)

Results Under Old Lines

Recent election results

2012 election

2014 election

2016 election

2018 election

In January 2018, 12-term incumbent Republican Rodney Frelinghuysen announced that he would not seek re-election; earlier, leading political observers had rated the district as a "toss-up" in the November 2018 election. Mikie Sherrill, a former Navy helicopter pilot and federal prosecutor, was the Democratic nominee in 2018. Assemblyman Jay Webber of New Jersey's 26th Assembly District was the Republican nominee. Attorney Ryan Martinez was the Libertarian Party nominee. On November 6, 2018, Sherrill prevailed by an unexpectedly large margin, defeating Webber 56.8%-42.1%. The district shifted 33% towards the Democrats.

2020 election

2022 election

List of members representing the district

References

Further reading

 Congressional Biographical Directory of the United States 1774–present

11
Essex County, New Jersey
Morris County, New Jersey
Passaic County, New Jersey
Somerset County, New Jersey
Sussex County, New Jersey
Constituencies established in 1913
1913 establishments in New Jersey